TSSR may refer to:

 Tajik Soviet Socialist Republic, now Tajikistan
 Turkmen Soviet Socialist Republic, now Turkmenistan